Namdeo Harbaji Diwathe (born 7 October 1933 in Lakhandur, Bhandara district) was a member of the 11th Lok Sabha of India. He represented the Chimur constituency of Maharashtra and is a member of the Bharatiya Janata Party political party.

References

India MPs 1996–1997
1933 births
Living people
Marathi politicians
Bharatiya Janata Party politicians from Maharashtra
Lok Sabha members from Maharashtra
People from Bhandara district
Members of the Maharashtra Legislative Assembly